Ftan Baraigla railway station is a railway station in the village of Ftan, within the municipality of Scuol, in the Swiss canton of Grisons. It is an intermediate stop on the  gauge Bever–Scuol-Tarasp line of the Rhaetian Railway.

Services
The following services stop at Ftan Baraigla:

References

External links
 
 

Scuol
Railway stations in Graubünden
Rhaetian Railway stations